Lampsilis bracteata, also known as the Texas fatmucket, is a species of freshwater mussel, an aquatic bivalve mollusk in the family Unionidae, the river mussels.

This species is endemic to the United States. Historically the Texas fatmucket had populations in at least 18 rivers in the upper Colorado, Guadalupe, and San Antonio River systems in central Texas.

References

External links
federalregister.gov

Molluscs of the United States
bracteata
Bivalves described in 1855
Taxonomy articles created by Polbot